Merger were an English reggae band of Jamaican/Ghanaian descent that formed in 1977 and lasted until 1980. Their name "Merger" comes from the fact that they blended reggae music with their other musical influences.  Their debut album, Exiles Ina Babylon was released in the UK in 1977 at a time when many British reggae bands, such as Aswad and Steel Pulse, were popular.  Politically, the band's songs addressed issues of racial injustice in Britain and other countries, but they rejected the Marcus Garvey idea that all black people should return to Africa.

Reception
 "The Jamaican/Ghanaian line up provided for a wide spectrum of reggae sounds. Merger's debut Exile In Babylon created a stir when released in 1977, critics deemed it too soft core, and felt it catered too much to the pop market." (Andrew Hamilton, Allmusic)
 "They integrated blues, soul, rock, funk and experimental influences in their musical efforts" (Teacher & Mr. T, Reggae Vibes)
 "Merger's reggae performance of "Soweto"... is a serious piece of polital pop, whose pretesting lyrics and skilful musicianship are more impressive than many of the fashion-rock bands" (Dr Ian Inglis, Popular Music And Television In Britain)
 "Led by the ever-so-soulful vocals of Barry Ford and the unusual deep voice of Michael Dan, with heavyweight compositions like "77" and "Understanding"" (Record Collector)
 "Merger created an experimental variation on the contemporary roots reggae formula and made many friends amongst those on the London gig circuit" (Dub Vendor)
 "At a time when the Iron Lady, Margaret Thatcher, boned socialism in English, "Exiles in Babylon" celebrates the fusion ( "merger" in English) of influences: reggae, punk, blues, jazz" (Reggae France)

Appearances
Merger appeared at the high-profile concert "The Picnic at Blackbushe" in 1978, alongside Bob Dylan, Eric Clapton and Joan Armatrading.

Members
 Barry Ford (guitar, vocals)
 Winston Bennett (guitar, vocals)
 Michael Dan (keyboards)
 Tony Osei (drums)
 Michael Osei (keyboards)
 Ivor Steadman (bass)

Discography

Albums
 Exiles In A Babylon (Sun-star Muzik Co, 1977)
 Armageddon Time (Bellaphon, 1980)
 Prisoner of Your Love (President, 1996)
 Exiles In A Babylon (re-issue, Makasound, 2009)

Singles
 "Seventy Seven" (CBS, 1979)
 "Biko" (Barclay, 1980)
 "Prisoner Of Your Love" / "You Are To Me" (Emergency, 1981)
 "Every Man Has A Woman Who Loves Him" (with Tchaï) (WEA, 1982)

References

External links

British reggae musical groups